ZVUE is a now inactive brand of portable media player designed and marketed by HandHeld Entertainment. The ZVUE device combined a digital mp3 audio player with a personal video player and a JPEG viewer all in one consumer electronics device about the size of a pack of playing cards. Widely distributed by Walmart, the Zvue beat the Apple video iPod into mass distribution by more than one year.

The ZVUE is similar to the video iPod and works on the MPEG-4 or H.264 video standard for video, MP3 standard for audio (in addition to OGG Vorbis) and the JPEG standard for images. The primary exception was the Zvue's sub $100.00 price point versus Apple's $300.00+ entry price for the first generation video iPod . The Zvue hand held media player proceeded the iPod by 3 years, quickly becoming a national sensation.

When first introduced, the Zvue was considered the lowest-cost commercially produced video media playerin the United States to support the Windows Media Video standard for video and the Windows Media Audio standard for audio around, including DRM so that legal licensed content from almost all non-apple media download sites can be played. The original ZVUE device retailed for about $100. The Zvue previewed in December 2003 becoming the first sub-$100 handheld video player commercially marketed in the United States.

Because of its early release date, the Zvue video player is thought to be the earliest commercially available handheld video  player to break the $100.00 price point marketed in the United States. Walmart was considered the Zvue's primary distribution partner in the United States. The Zvue became available in excess of 5000 Walmart stores as well as Walmart .com's online marketplace.
The Zvue brand owned by publicly traded ( Nasdaq "Zvue"] Handheld Entertainment quickly morphed into one of the internet's largest and fastest growing humor portals on the Web according to Comscore in a 2007 Press Release. By 2007, Zvue's on line content portal aggregated a series of website acquisitions, spending approximately 45 million dollars to do so. This turned HandHeld Entertainment into one of the United States ten largest web sites measured by unique user traffic & unique user visits by 2007. Zvue literally created the equivalent of a "hub and spoke" television network for the Web complete with up to 32 million unique monthly visitors.

Zvue's revenue quickly pivoted from device derived sales into revenue generated by a large ad supported content portal focused on the Zvue player customer but open to all MPEG-4 players from multiple manufacturers. By lowering the ring-fence, and executing its acquisition strategy the site quickly grew and became of largest in the United States by virtue of 32,000,000 unique monthly visitors and in excess of 3 billion monthly page views.

Storage Device

The ZVUE Media player requires SD cards.

External links 
Disassembly report about Zvue media player, includes further links.

Digital audio players
Portable media players
Consumer electronics brands